Cecilia Suárez is a Mexican actress. She has starred in over 60 films and television shows since 1997, being nominated for her acting on 15 occasions. She has received two lifetime achievement awards for her film and TV career: one in Mexico and one in Spain; in Mexico she was the first woman to receive such an award.

Suárez has had over 30 theatrical roles since 1992, with multiple awards and nominations. She has received a lifetime achievement award for her theatre career.

Filmography

Film roles

Television roles

Theatrical roles and accolades

Awards and nominations for film and television

Ariel Awards 
Suárez has twice been nominated for an Ariel Award, the Mexican Academy of Film awards.

Bravo Awards 
Suárez has won a Bravo television award.

Emmy Awards 
Suárez has been nominated for one International Emmy Award.

Diosas de Plata 
Suárez has been nominated for two Diosas de Plata, the Mexican Film Journalists' award, winning one.

Guadalajara International Film Festival 
Suárez has twice won an award at the Guadalajara International Film Festival.

Lleida Latin-American Film Festival 
Suárez has won once at the Lleida Latin-American Film Festival.

Miami International Film Festival 
Suárez has won one Grand Jury Prize at the Miami International Film Festival.

MTV Movie & TV Awards 
Suárez has been nominated for an MTV Movie Award on two consecutive occasions.

Platino Awards 
Suárez has won one Platino Award, the Ibero-American film and television awards.

Premios Canacine 
Suárez has been nominated for two Premios Canacine.

References

External links

Actress filmographies
Lists of awards received by actor
Mexican filmographies